The 1962 United States Senate special election in Idaho took place on November 6, 1962, to elect a U.S. Senator to complete the unexpired term of Senator Henry Dworshak, who died on July 23, 1962.

Following his nomination for the special election by the Republican state committee, former Governor of Idaho Len Jordan was appointed on August 6, 1962 by Governor Robert E. Smylie to fill the vacancy until a special election could be held.

Jordan won the special election, narrowly defeating Democratic nominee Gracie Pfost.

Nominations
As the vacancy occurred after the primary elections for the ordinary 1962 elections were held, the candidates were selected by the state central committees.

Democratic nomination

Candidate
Gracie Pfost, incumbent Congresswoman for Idaho's 1st congressional district

Results
The Democratic state committee met at Boise on August 18. They nominated Gracie Pfost unanimously by voice vote.

Republican primary

Candidates
Hamer Budge, former U.S. Representative
Len Jordan, former Governor
A. W. Naegle, president pro tempore of the Idaho Senate
George V. Hansen, Pocatello city commissioner
John C. Sanborn, former U.S. Representative
Dick Smith, Rexburg
Sid Smith, Kootenai County
Dr. Raymond L. White, Boise

Results
The Republican state committee met at Pocatello on August 4. They nominated Len Jordan unanimously on the second ballot.

The unofficial results of the first ballot were as follows:

General election

Results

See also 
 1962 United States Senate elections

References

Bibliography
 
 

1962 Special
Idaho Special
United States Senate Special
Idaho 1962
Idaho 1962
United States Senate 1962